Narcissus abscissus is a species of the genus Narcissus (Daffodils) in the family Amaryllidaceae. It is classified in Section Pseudonarcissus. It is native to France and Spain in the region of the Pyrenees.

Description 
A classic daffodil; its leaves are green or slightly blue-green, erect, between two and four leaves, 30 cm long to approximately 1 cm wide. Its stem is compressed, sharply double-edged 35 cm long and its pedicel 2.5 cm long. Its flowers are solitary and horizontal with large blooms of 10 cm in diameter. The flowers are large with cream colored tepals and a deep yellow corona that does not expand distally. Narcissus abcissus blooms in late spring and grows on slopes and high mountain valleys of the Pyrenees along the French-Spanish border.

Taxonomy 
Narcissus abscissus was described by (Haw.) Schult. & Schult.f. and published on Syst. veg. 7: 941, in the year 1830.

Etymology 
Narcissus: generic name that refers to the young narcissist from Greek mythology Νάρκισσος (Narkissos), son of the river god Cephissus and the nymph Liriope; that was distinguished by his beauty.

The name derives from the Greek word: ναρκὰο, narkào (= narcotic) and refers to the pungent and intoxicating smell of the flowers of some species (some argue that the word derives from the Persian word نرگس and is pronounced Nargis, indicating that this plant is intoxicating).

abscissus: Latin epithet meaning "cut".

Synonyms 
 Ajax abscissus Haw.
 Ajax serotinus Jord.
 Ajax tubulosus Jord.
 Narcissus muticus J.Gay
 Narcissus pseudonarcissus subsp. abscissus (Haw.) K.Richt.
 Narcissus pseudonarcissus subsp. muticus (J.Gay) Baker
 Oileus abscissus (Haw.) Haw.

References

Bibliography 

Narcissus abscissus  The Plant List
Narcissus abscissus  World Checklist

abscissus
Garden plants
Flora of Spain
Flora of France
Plants described in 1830